South Lafourche Leonard Miller Jr. Airport  is a public use airport in Lafourche Parish, Louisiana, United States. It is owned by the Greater Lafourche Port Commission and located one nautical mile (2 km) east of the central business district of Galliano, Louisiana. This airport is included in the National Plan of Integrated Airport Systems for 2011–2015, which categorized it as a general aviation facility.

Although many U.S. airports use the same three-letter location identifier for the FAA and IATA, this airport is assigned GAO by the FAA but has no designation from the IATA (which assigned GAO to Los Canos Airport in Guantanamo, Cuba).

Facilities and aircraft 
South Lafourche Leonard Miller Jr. Airport covers an area of 390 acres (158 ha) at an elevation of 1 feet (0.3 m) above mean sea level. It has one runway designated 18/36 with an asphalt surface measuring 6,502 by 100 feet (1,982 x 30 m).  It also has one helipad designated H1 with a concrete surface measuring 60 by 60 feet (18 x 18 m).

For the 12-month period ending April 12, 2012, the airport had 14,004 aircraft operations, an average of 38 per day: 99.6% general aviation and 0.4% military.
At that time there were 29 aircraft based at this airport: 58.6% helicopter, 27.6% single-engine, and 13.8% jet.

References

External links 
 Airport page at Greater Lafourche Port Commission
 South Lafourche Leonard Miller Jr. Airport (GAO) at LaDOTD airport directory
 GAO FBO Services, the fixed-base operator
 Aerial image as of October 1990 from USGS The National Map
 

Airports in Louisiana
Transportation in Lafourche Parish, Louisiana
Buildings and structures in Lafourche Parish, Louisiana